Tygodnik Solidarność ("Solidarity Weekly") is a Polish right-wing weekly magazine. Started and published by the Solidarity movement on 3 April 1981, it was banned a year later by the People's Republic of Poland following the martial law declaration from 13 December 1981 and the thaw of 1989. It was legalized in June 1989 after the Polish legislative elections, 1989.

Editors 
Tadeusz Mazowiecki
Jarosław Kaczyński
Andrzej Gelberg
Jerzy Kłosiński

References

External links
 Official website
 Scans of Tygodnik Solidarność from 1st issue, April 3, 1981; to 37th issue, December 11, 1981

1981 establishments in Poland
Magazines established in 1981
Magazines published in Warsaw
Polish-language magazines
Weekly magazines published in Poland
Political magazines published in Poland
Solidarity (Polish trade union)